pkgsrc (package source) is a package management system for Unix-like operating systems. It was forked from the FreeBSD ports collection in 1997 as the primary package management system for NetBSD. Since then it has evolved independently; in 1999, support for Solaris was added, followed by support for other operating systems.

pkgsrc currently contains over 22,000 packages and includes most popular open-source software. It is the native package manager on NetBSD, SmartOS and MINIX 3, and is portable across 23 different operating systems, including AIX, various BSD derivatives, HP-UX, IRIX, Linux, macOS, Solaris, and QNX.

There are multiple ways to install programs using pkgsrc. The pkgsrc bootstrap contains a traditional ports collection that utilizes a series of makefiles to compile software from source. A high-level utility named  also exists, and is designed to automate the installation, removal, and update of binary packages in a manner similar to Debian's Advanced Packaging Tool.

Several vendors, including MNX.io, provide binary packages for popular operating systems, including macOS and Linux.

Supported platforms

History 
On October 3, 1997, NetBSD developers Alistair Crooks and Hubert Feyrer created pkgsrc based on the FreeBSD ports system and intended to support the NetBSD packages collection. It was officially released as part of NetBSD 1.3 on January 4, 1998. DragonFly BSD used pkgsrc as its official package system from version 1.4 in 2006, to 3.4 in 2013.

On 2017-09-12, a commit message policy that accommodates DVCS was established by the project.

Packages 

The NetBSD Foundation provides official, pre-built binary packages for multiple combinations of NetBSD and pkgsrc releases, and occasionally for certain other operating systems as well.

As of 2018, several vendors provide pre-built binary packages for several platforms:

 Since at least 2014, Joyent has provided binary packages for SmartOS/illumos, macOS, and Enterprise Linux (CentOS/Oracle/Red Hat/Scientific).  Packages are provided on a rolling release basis from the trunk (HEAD, in CVS terminology) of pkgsrc, with updates every few days; additionally, quarterly stable releases of pkgsrc for Joyent's own SmartOS are also provided (dating back to 2012Q4).

 Since 2017, University of Wisconsin–Milwaukee has provided binary packages for NetBSD, RHEL/CentOS, and Darwin/macOS.  Packages are only built from the quarterly releases of pkgsrc, aiding use in long-term experiments, where stability and reproducibility of the findings is of the essence.

References

External links

 
 A web interface for pkgsrc
 pkgsrc-wip – a project to get more people actively involved with pkgsrc
 pkgsrcCon: An annual conference focusing on pkgsrc
 pkgsrc binary packages for SmartOS/illumos, macOS and Linux from Joyent
 /r/pkgsrc on Reddit

Console applications
Free package management systems
Linux package management-related software
NetBSD
Package management systems
Software using the BSD license
Unix package management-related software
Utilities for Linux
Utilities for macOS